The Scarlet Spear is a 1954 British drama film directed by George P. Breakston and starring John Bentley and Martha Hyer. The cast consisted mostly of Kenyan actors. The plot concerns a British District Officer who tries to prevent a ritual killing.

Premise
In the colonial era, a young British District Officer tries to persuade the new chief of a tribe not to commit a ritual killing.

Cast
 John Bentley as District Officer Jim T. Barneson
 Martha Hyer as Christine
 Morasi as Morasi, the chief's son
 Yusef as Yusef, the head bearer
 Faraji as Faraji, the second bearer
 Thea Gregory

References

External links

1954 films
1950s adventure drama films
British adventure drama films
Films shot in Kenya
Films set in Kenya
Films directed by George Breakston
1954 drama films
United Artists films
1950s English-language films
1950s British films